Pilar Geijo (born 19 September 1984 in Buenos Aires) is a Marathon swimmer from Argentina. She has won most of the world's greatest ultra-marathon swimming competitions: the 2010 Traversée Internationale du Lac Memphrémagog (34K event), the 2011 Maratona del Golfo Capri Napoli Marathon (36K), the 2010 16K FINA Open Water Swimming Grand Prix in Sumidero Canyon in Mexico, and the longest race in the world, the 88K Hernandarias-Parana FINA Grand Prix event (88K) in Argentina. She has won the FINA Grand Prix circuit in 2010 and 2011.

References

Swimmers at the 2011 Pan American Games
Female long-distance swimmers
Argentine female swimmers
Living people
1984 births
Swimmers from Buenos Aires
South American Games silver medalists for Argentina
South American Games medalists in swimming
Competitors at the 2006 South American Games
Pan American Games competitors for Argentina